Ivan Sekyra (1 October 1952, Prague, Czechoslovakia − 30 June 2012, Prague, Czech Republic) was a Czech rock guitarist, singer, songwriter, director, and screenwriter. He learned to play the violin as a child. In 1978, he graduated from the Faculty of Mechanical Engineering at the University of Life Sciences in Prague. In 1976, he co-founded the group Abraxas. Later, he was a member of Projektil and Drakar. He eventually founded the heavy metal band Silent Garden.

References

External links
 Ivan Sekyra on Discogs

1952 births
2012 deaths
Czech guitarists
Male guitarists
Czechoslovak male singers
Czech screenwriters
Male screenwriters
Czech film directors
Czech rock musicians
20th-century Czech male singers